Teteven Glacier is a glacier on Greenwich Island in the South Shetland Islands, Antarctica situated east of Yakoruda Glacier, west of Quito Glacier, northwest of Traub Glacier and north of Murgash Glacier. It extends 6.5 km in east-west direction and 3.8 km in north-south direction, and drains the north slopes of Dryanovo Heights into the Drake Passage in Haskovo Cove and Skaptopara Cove between Miletich Point and the ice-free area at Agüedo Point.

The glacier is named after the town of Teteven in the central Balkan Mountains, Bulgaria.

Location

See also
 List of glaciers in the Antarctic
 Glaciology

Maps
 L.L. Ivanov et al. Antarctica: Livingston Island and Greenwich Island, South Shetland Islands. Scale 1:100000 topographic map. Sofia: Antarctic Place-names Commission of Bulgaria, 2005.
 L.L. Ivanov. Antarctica: Livingston Island and Greenwich, Robert, Snow and Smith Islands. Scale 1:120000 topographic map.  Troyan: Manfred Wörner Foundation, 2009.

References
 SCAR Composite Antarctic Gazetteer
 Bulgarian Antarctic Gazetteer. Antarctic Place-names Commission. (details in Bulgarian, basic data in English)

External links
 Teteven Glacier. Copernix satellite image

Glaciers of Greenwich Island